Ballads and Songs is an album by Nic Jones, released in 1970.

Track listing
"Sir Patrick Spens" 3:53
"The Butcher and the Tailor's Wife" 1:51
"The Duke of Marlborough" 4:04
"Annan Water" 7:04
"The Noble Lord Hawkins" 2:12
"Don't You Be Foolish, Pray" 1:31
"The Outlandish Knight" 4:11
"Reynard the Fox" 2:17
"Little Musgrave" 6:11

References

1970 albums
Nic Jones albums